Pothyne virgata is a species of beetle in the family Cerambycidae. It was described by Gahan in 1907. It is distributed in Sumatra.

References

virgata
Beetles described in 1907